The Unzha is a river in the Vologda Oblast and Kostroma Oblast in Russia, a tributary of the Volga. The Unzha begins at the confluence of the rivers Kema and the Lundonga. It flows into the Unzhensky Cove of the Gorky Reservoir. 

The Unzha freezes up between October and December and stays under the ice until April or May. The main tributaries are the Viga, Neya, and the Mezha. The towns of Kologriv, Manturovo and Makaryev are along the Unzha River.

References 

Rivers of Vologda Oblast
Rivers of Kostroma Oblast